The Autoroute 1, abbreviated to A1 or otherwise known as the Trier motorway, is a motorway in Luxembourg. A few hundred metres to the north of  Wasserbillig, it reaches the German border, whereupon it becomes the A64, which leads to Trier.

Overview
Originally a connection from Luxembourg City to Luxembourg Airport, at Senningerberg, in 1969, the A1 was extended in three stages from 1988 to 1992 to connect to the German border.  From 1994 to 1996, two more sections were opened, bypassing the south-east of Luxembourg City and connecting the A1 to the Croix de Gasperich, where it meets the A3 (to Dudelange) and A6 (towards Arlon, in Belgium).

In all, the A1 was opened in six separate sections:
 1969: Kirchberg - Senningerberg
 6 September 1988: Potaschberg - Wasserbillig
 11 July 1990: Senningerberg - Munsbach
 26 June 1992: Munsbach - Potaschberg
 20 May 1994: Croix de Gasperich - Irrgarten
 23 September 1996: Irrgarten - Kirchberg

Route

References

External links

  Administration des Ponts et Chaussées

Motorways in Luxembourg